Mycosphaerella punctiformis is a fungal plant pathogen.

In Iceland it is common on the dead leaves of Betula pubescens and Salix lanata.

See also
 List of Mycosphaerella species

References

Fungal plant pathogens and diseases
punctiformis
Fungi described in 1794
Taxa named by Christiaan Hendrik Persoon